Abrami is a surname. Notable people with the surname include:

Felice Abrami (1872–1919), Italian artist
Lahcen Abrami (born 1969), Moroccan footballer
Léon Abrami (1879–1939), French politician